is a metropolitan road that connects the Yashiobashi intersection in Shinagawa, Tokyo and the Nakajuku intersection in Itabashi. It passes between Route 317 (Yamate-dori) and Route 318 (Kannana-dori), and play a role in connecting them. It is sometimes referred to as the "Ring Road 6.5".

In popular culture
Tokyo Metropolitan Road Route 420 was featured on an episode of Tamori Club, which introduced this road under construction on July 13, 2013 as "(commonly known as) Ring Road 6.5".

References

Roads in Tokyo
Prefectural roads in Japan